Chelsea Camille Pinnix is an American oncologist who is an Associate Professor of Radiation Oncology and Director of the Residency Program at the MD Anderson Cancer Center (MDACC). Having joined the faculty 2012, her research looks to improve the outcomes of patients who suffer from lymphoma.

Pinnix attended the University of Maryland, Baltimore County for her undergraduate degree, where she studied biochemistry. She was a member of the Meyerhoff Scholarship Program. She moved to the University of Pennsylvania for her medical degree, and completed an MD-PhD in 2007. She was awarded a National Institutes of Health Medical Science Scholarship and the NIH Ruth L. Kirschstein National Research Service Award. In 2010 she was supported by the UNCF to complete postdoctoral research at the MDACC.

Selected publications

References 

Year of birth missing (living people)
Living people
University of Maryland, Baltimore County alumni
Cancer researchers
American oncologists
Women oncologists
American physicians
African-American physicians
University of Pennsylvania alumni
University of Texas faculty
University of Texas MD Anderson Cancer Center faculty
21st-century African-American people